Julian Pearce may refer to:
 Julian Pearce (field hockey)
 Julian Pearce (geochemist)